The men's 50 metre rifle three positions event was a shooting sports event held as part of the Shooting at the 1984 Summer Olympics programme. The competition was held on August 1, 1984, at the shooting ranges in Los Angeles. 51 shooters from 29 nations competed.

Results

References

Shooting at the 1984 Summer Olympics
Men's 050m 3 positions 1984
Men's events at the 1984 Summer Olympics